Heading West may refer to:

 "Heading West" (song), by Cyndi Lauper
 Headin' West, 1922 film
 Heading West (film), 1946 film